The PSA World Tour 2015 is the international squash tour organised circuit organized by the Professional Squash Association (PSA) for the 2015 men's and women's squash season. The most important tournament in the series is the World Championship held in Bellevue, Washington in the United States. The tour features three categories of regular events, World Series, which feature the highest prize money and the best fields, International and Challenger.

In November 2014, the Women's Squash Association and the Professional Squash Association announced a historic merge between the two associations. A decision was reached that will see the Professional Squash Association operate as the governing body for both the women's and men's ranks from January 1, 2015.

Calendar
Categories: International tournaments and more.

Key

January–June 2015

January

February

March

April

May

June

July

August 2015–July 2016

August

September

October

November

December

January

February

March

April

May

June

July

Year end world top 10 players

Men's world ranking

Women's world ranking

Retirements
Following is a list of notable players (winners of a main tour title, and/or part of the PSA Men's World Rankings and Women's World Rankings top 30 for at least one month) who announced their retirement from professional squash, became inactive, or were permanently banned from playing, during the 2015 season:

 Amr Shabana (born 29 July 1979 in the Cairo, Egypt) joined the pro tour in 1995, reached the world no. 1 ranking in April 2006. Keeping the spot for 33 months between 2006 and 2008. He won four World Open Squash Championship titles in 2003, 2005, 2007 and 2009. The Egyptian also has won 33 PSA World Tour titles including four Hong Kong Open titles in 2006, 2007, 2008 and 2009, two titles of the US Open, 3 titles of the Tournament of Champions in New York or two Qatar Classic titles in 2006 and 2007. He retired in September after past more than ten years in the top 10 PSA World Ranking.
 Madeline Perry (born 11 February 1977 in Banbridge, Northern Ireland) joined the pro tour in 1998, reached the world no. 3 ranking in April 2011. She reached the final of the British Open in 2009 against Rachael Grinham and the final of the Qatar Classic in 2011 against Nicol David. She also has won 11 PSA World Tour titles including the Australian Open and the Irish Squash Open. She retired in April 2015 after competing a last time the Irish Squash Open in Dublin.
 Peter Barker (born 26 September 1983 in London, England) joined the pro tour in 2002, reached the singles no. 5 spot in 2012. He won 16 PSA World Tour titles including four times the Colombian Open in 2005, 2006, 2007 and 2013, the Kuala Lumpur Open in 2009 and the Malaysian Open in 2013. He reached the semi-finals of the World Championship in 2010 and two times the semi-finals of the prestigious British Open in 2009 and 2012. He retired in December after competing a last time in the Hong Kong Open.
 Ong Beng Hee (born 4 February 1980 in Penang, Malaysia) joined the pro tour in 1995, reached the singles no. 7 spot in 2001. Gold medallist of the Asian Games in 2002 and 2006, he won 15 PSA World Tour titles including three times the Malaysian Open in 2000, 2005 and 2008, the Kuala Lumpur Open in 2008, the Macau Open and the Swedish Open. He retired in July after competing a last time in the El Gouna International in Egypt.

See also
Professional Squash Association (PSA)
2015 PSA World Series
Men's World Rankings
Women's World Rankings
2015–16 PSA World Series
PSA World Series Finals
PSA World Open
2015 Men's World Team Squash Championships

References

External links
 PSA World Tour

PSA World Tour seasons
2015 in squash
2016 in squash